The 1974–75 season was the 29th season in FK Partizan's existence. This article shows player statistics and matches that the club played during the 1974–75 season.

Players

Squad information

Friendlies

Competitions

Yugoslav First League

Matches

Yugoslav Cup

UEFA Cup

First round

Second round

Third round

Statistics

Goalscorers 
This includes all competitive matches.

Score overview

See also
 List of FK Partizan seasons

References

External links
 Official website
 Partizanopedia 1974-75  (in Serbian)

FK Partizan seasons
Partizan